Engelking is a surname. Notable people with the surname include: 

Barbara Engelking (born 1962), Polish sociologist
Janie Ward-Engelking, American politician
Leszek Engelking (born 1955), Polish poet, critic, and translator
Ryszard Engelking (born 1935), Polish mathematician